James Todd Snyder (born October 22, 1948) is a former American football wide receiver in the National Football League who played for the Atlanta Falcons. He played college football for the Ohio Bobcats.

References

1948 births
Living people
American football wide receivers
Atlanta Falcons players
Ohio Bobcats football players